Life of Pi is a 2012 American 3D adventure drama film based on Yann Martel's 2001 novel of the same name. Directed by Ang Lee, the film is based on an adapted screenplay by David Magee, and stars Suraj Sharma, Irrfan Khan, Gérard Depardieu, Tabu, and Adil Hussain.

The film premiered on September 28, 2012 as the opening film of the 50th New York Film Festival at the Lincoln Center in New York City, and had its wide-release on November 21, 2012.

Awards and nominations

References

External links
 

Lists of accolades by film